is a Japanese retired sprinter. He currently holds the Asian indoor record in the 4 × 400 metres relay with 3:05.90 minutes, achieved with teammates Jun Osakada, Masayoshi Kan and Shunji Karube in March 1999 in Maebashi. He also formerly held the Japanese record in the 200 metres with 20.57 seconds.

He is currently (2020) the athletic director at Hamamatsu Koto High School.

Personal bests
100 metres – 10.24 (+0.4 m/s, Toyama 1994): Former national junior (U20) and high school record
200 metres – 20.57 (+0.5 m/s, Osaka 1994): Former national senior, junior (U20) and high school record
4×400 metres relay (Indoor) – 3:05.90 (1st leg, Maebashi 1999): Current Asian indoor record

International competitions

National titles
National Championships
200 m: 1994
National Corporate Championships
200 m: 2000
National High School Championships
100 m: 1994
200 m: 1994
4×100 m relay: 1994
4×400 m relay: 1994
National Sports Festival
100 m (Boys A): 1994

References

External links

1976 births
Living people
Sportspeople from Nara Prefecture
Japanese male sprinters
Japanese athletics coaches
Asian Games competitors for Japan
Athletes (track and field) at the 1994 Asian Games
Japan Championships in Athletics winners
Waseda University alumni
20th-century Japanese people